is a 1988 Japanese animated science fiction film set in the Universal Century timeline of the Gundam franchise.

Making its theatrical debut on March 12, 1988, Char's Counterattack is the culmination of the original saga begun in Mobile Suit Gundam and continued through Mobile Suit Zeta Gundam and Mobile Suit Gundam ZZ, marking the final conflict of the fourteen-year rivalry between the characters Amuro Ray and Char Aznable.

In addition to being the first original Gundam theatrical release, Char's Counterattack was also the first Gundam production to make use of computer graphics during a five-second shot of the Sweetwater colony rotating in space, being made at Toyo Links. Char's Counterattack was released in America on DVD on August 20, 2002 and was broadcast on January 4, 2003 on Cartoon Network's Adult Swim programming block.

Plot 
In UC 0093, Char Aznable has returned to lead Neo Zeon. As the film opens, Char's forces have arranged to drop the asteroid Fifth Luna on the Earth. Special task force Londo Bell, whose members include veteran soldiers Amuro Ray and Bright Noa, attempt to prevent the catastrophe. Char is successful and the asteroid crashes into Lhasa, Tibet.

Earth Federation Prime Minister Adenaur Paraya and his teenage daughter Quess narrowly escape the crashing asteroid. Their space shuttle meets with Londo Bell's command ship, the Ra Cailum, which has just finished collecting Amuro's new mobile suit, the RX-93 Nu Gundam, and Amuro's close friend Chan Agi. The Nu Gundam is equipped with new “psycho-frame” technology, which amplifies Newtype abilities. Bright is reunited with his young son Hathaway, who was also on the escaping shuttle. Adenaur instructs Bright to deliver him to the colony Londenion for some important business. While on board, Quess becomes smitten with Amuro, and Hathaway develops a crush on Quess.

On the Londenion colony, Adenaur's business is revealed to be a secret meeting with Char and other Neo Zeon leaders to arrange a treaty; the Neo Zeon will gain the asteroid Axis in exchange for disarming their fleet. While relaxing on the colony with Quess and Hathaway, Amuro recognizes Char and confronts him. Overhearing the two men argue, Quess becomes enamored of Char's philosophies and leaves the colony with him, much to Hathaway's distress.

Quess turns out to be a Newtype and a naturally talented mobile suit pilot. Char takes advantage of her unstable nature and manipulates her feelings to use her as a weapon against Amuro. Char reveals that the treaty with the Federation is a ruse. The Neo Zeon forces ambush the Federation fleet at the supposed disarmament, and Axis is sent on a collision course with the Earth. Londo Bell attempts to stop the asteroid using Axis’ stockpile of nuclear weapons, but only succeeds in splitting the asteroid into two pieces.

A furious battle between Londo Bell, the Federation, and Neo Zeon erupts. Quess descends into madness and violence while piloting the psycho-frame-equipped mobile armor Alpha Azieru. Hathaway steals a mobile suit and futilely tries to convince Quess to stop fighting and come with him. Chan kills Quess to protect Hathaway from the girl's insane attacks but is herself killed by Hathaway in a rage over Quess's death. Amuro and Char duel in their psycho-frame mobile suits, the Nu Gundam and MSN-04 Sazabi, and Amuro defeats his long-time rival. With Char's escape pod in tow, Amuro desperately attempts to push back the descending Axis asteroid, aided by Federation and Zeon suits alike. The power of the Nu Gundam's psycho-frame amplifies Amuro's Newtype abilities to an unbelievable level. Amuro, Char, and the Nu Gundam vanish in a massive flare of light as both halves of Axis are pushed away from the Earth.

Production and development 

Yoshiyuki Tomino adapted Char's Counterattack from his novel Hi-Streamer (originally titled Mobile Suit Gundam: Char's Counterattack) (which was published in two versions), and wrote Beltorchika's Children as an alternate version. Tomino had planned previously to feature Char's return in Mobile Suit Gundam ZZ, however when he got the green light to do Char's Counterattack, he dropped the planned appearance. Tomino does not recall his plans to bring back Char in Mobile Suit Gundam ZZ.  The Beltorchika's Childrens differences from the film include Amuro and Char piloting advanced versions of the ν-Gundam and the Sazabi: the Hi-ν-Gundam and the MSN-04-II Nightingale, Z Gundam character Beltorchika Irma being pregnant with Amuro's child, Hathaway accidentally killing Quess instead of Chan, and the confirmed deaths of Amuro and Char.

 Staff 

 Director/Screenplay: Yoshiyuki Tomino
 Character Designer: Hiroyuki Kitazume
 Mobile Suit Designer: Yutaka Izubuchi
 Mecha Designs: Gainax, Yoshinori Sayama
 Art Director: Shigemi Ikeda

Cast

Theme music Ending:'''

Lyrics: Mitsuko Komuro
Composition  Arrangement: Tetsuya Komuro
Artist: TM Network (Tetsuya Komuro, Takashi Utsunomiya and Naoto Kine)

Release
At the Japanese box office, the film sold 1.3million tickets and grossed .

The film made its American debut on August 20, 2002 on DVD and was later re-released during Sunrise's release of its One Year War properties (specifically Mobile Suit Gundam, 08th MS Team, 0080, and 0083).

As part of the 40th anniversary celebration of the Gundam franchise, Char's Counterattack played in select theaters in the U.S. on December 5, 2019.

Home media
Bandai released a DVD of the film on August 20, 2002. The product was a maroon slipcase edition embossed with the gold Neo Zeon logo. The DVD was later reissued as part of the Anime Legends line in 2006. Due to the closure of Bandai Entertainment, the film has been out of print for sometime. On October 11, 2014 at their 2014 New York Comic-Con panel, Sunrise announced they will be releasing all of the Gundam franchise, including Gundam SEED: Special Edition in North America though distribution from Right Stuf Inc., beginning in Spring 2015.

By 2008, the film had sold 300,000 units on DVD.

Game
Bandai produced a Char's Counterattack 3D fighting game for the PlayStation in 1998 as part of the Big Bang Project for Gundam's 20th anniversary. The game featured scenes from the film that were remade with updated animation and CGI. The game also has stages featuring Amuro and Char's classic encounters in the original Mobile Suit Gundam series.

Toys/Models
A line of Gunpla models based on the film's mobile suits was released, along with a Hobby Japan special. The model line had 1/144 kits of the Jegan, the Geara Doga, the Sazabi, Gyunei Guss and Quess Paraya's Jagd Dogas, and the ν-Gundam (with or without Fin Funnel), a 1/550 α-Azieru, and a 1/100 ν-Gundam. Bandai would re-release them plus the Hi-ν-Gundam and a heavy weapons version of the ν-Gundam, years later as part of the HGUC and Master Grade lines, the latter being featured in Bandai's Gundam Weapons line of mooks. Many of them are also available as part of the B-Club resin line. In 2011, a model kit manufacturer in China, MCModel, produced 1/144 scale kits of the ν-Gundam and Hi-ν-Gundam called "Gundooms" that are reportedly much more detailed than the same kits from Bandai based on their origins as retooled versions of resin conversion kits. Another company, Regulation Center, later followed suit with a 1/100 Nightingale kit. Bandai's special museum contained a 1/100 prototype of the Nightingale; the company went public at the 2014 Shizuoka Hobby Show with the announcement of a new RE/100 category of scale models, with the Nightingale as the first release in September 2014.

Veteran mechanical designer Hajime Katoki redesigned the MG version of the Sazabi, resulting in a slightly blockier appearance more suitable for modeling. Due to the substantial size and heft, it is one of the most expensive 1/100th-scale Master Grade kits yet manufactured, trumped only by the enormous Perfect Zeong kit, released in 2004. The ν-Gundam, Hi-ν-Gundam, and Sazabi would be released as part of Katoki's Ver. Ka line of redesigned Gunpla model kits, their most noticeable design cues being splitting panels designed to show off the psycoframe in the v-Gundam, and the internal frame structure in the Sazabi.

The ν-Gundam and Sazabi were the first offerings in Bandai's "Formania" line of extensively detailed machine busts in September 2010.

Some of the film's units were also released as action figures, with the RX-93 and the Sazabi produced in various forms, the latest of which being under the Robot Spirits line. Bandai, in particular, produced an online-exclusive RX-93 equipment set featuring a second set of Fin-Funnels and a Fin-Funnel equipment set that includes effect parts to recreate the ν-Gundam's beam pyramid. A version of the ν-Gundam produced for the Taiwanese market has a special psycho-frame effect where parts of the body are molded in crystal green. Bandai released the Hi-ν in early 2014 and is slated to release the unit as part of the Metal Robot Spirits line, a version of regular Robot Spirits figures using diecast metal parts.

Manga
Two manga adaptations of the film were released, one by Tosiya Murakami in April and May 1988, and another by Kōichi Tokita from October 1998 to February 1999.
A manga adaptation of Beltorchika's Children, illustrated by Sabishi Uroaki and Takayuki Yanase was published in Gundam Ace from June 2014 to March 2018 issues and compiled into seven volumes.

Denpa licensed the Beltorchika's Children'' manga in North America.

References

External links 

 Official Website: Anime
 
 
 
Animerica review

1988 anime films
1998 manga
Bandai Entertainment anime titles
Children's manga
Char's Counterattack
Eco-terrorism in fiction
Impact events in fiction
Comets in film
Japanese animated films
Kodansha manga
Kōichi Tokita
Sunrise (company)